"unravel" is the first solo single by Tōru "TK" Kitajima, from the band Ling tosite Sigure. "unravel" was released on July 23, 2014 by  Sony Music Entertainment Japan.

Background 
"unravel" is used as the opening theme for the anime series Tokyo Ghoul. 

Mary's Blood recorded a heavy metal version of the song for their 2020 cover album Re>Animator.

Track list

Credits and personnel
Adapted from "unravel" liner notes.

Production
TK – arranger, producer, recording engineer, mixing engineer
Fumiaki Unehara – assistant engineer
Ted Jensen – mastering engineer

Musicians
TK –  vocals (tracks 1, 2), guitar (all tracks)
BOBO – drums (tracks 1, 3)
Hidekazu Hinata  "Hinatch" – bass  (all tracks)
Mamiko Hirai – piano (all tracks)
Takashi Kashikura – drums (track 2)
Honoka Sato – violin (track 3)
Kei Sakamoto – flute (track 3)

Charts

Certifications and sales

Awards and nominations

References

External links
 
 

2014 songs
2014 singles
Anime songs
Post-hardcore songs
Sony Music Entertainment Japan singles
Tokyo Ghoul